The white-plumed antbird (Pithys albifrons) is a small species of insectivorous bird found in the understories of rainforests. It is smaller than most species of its family (Thamnophilidae), weighing 26 grams on average. The family Thamnophilidae is known commonly as the antbirds, as they use the presence of ants (army ants in particular) to locate food. This species is largely solitary except during the breeding season, and different individuals will follow individual ant swarms.

Taxonomy
The first formal description of the white-plumed antbird was by the Swedish naturalist Carl Linnaeus in 1766 in the twelfth edition of his Systema Naturae. He introduced the binomial name Pipra albifrons.

There are three subspecies of the white-plumed antbird: Pithys alifrons ssp. albifrons, P. albifrons ssp. peruvianus and P. albifrons brevibarba. It is most closely related to the white-masked antbird (P. castaneus). The most closely related genus is Phaenostictus, the members of which they may resemble from a distance. The genera may be distinguished by smaller length and weight, shorter tails and louder songs in Pithys spp. than Phaenostictus spp.

Description
The white-plumed antbird is monomorphic, meaning both sexes look the same. Adults have extensive rufous-chestnut plumage on their body, with contrasting black wings and head, and their signature white throats and feathered periocular tufts. Their feet and tarsus are bright orange. White-plumed antbirds have an average total body length of 13 cm, 4.6 cm of which is tail. Their bill is 1.16 cm long and only 0.47 cm wide on average, indicative of its insect food source. Young birds will have rufous coloured tips on their secondaries and a grayish head, without the white plumes or rufous collar.

Habitat and distribution
The species is found in Brazil, Colombia, Venezuela, Ecuador and Peru; also the Guianas: Guyana, Suriname, and French Guiana. Its natural habitat is tropical moist lowland rainforests. The white-plummed antbird appears in higher abundances in forests with high canopies, high vegetation complexity and many plant species 

In the Amazon Basin proper, except in the headwaters of central Peru, the white-plumed antbird is found only north of the Amazon River, in the northeast (Guianas) and in the northwest, from Amapa and Cayenne westward to the Andes from southern Venezuela to northern Peru. They show higher survival in the eastern Amazon rainforest than in the western.

Each individual occupies a home range exceeding  in order to ensure that swarms of army ants to follow to food can be found at all times. They will avoid open habitats and will not cross rivers. They have, however, been found crossing roads to get from one patch of forest to another.

Behavior
White-plumed antbirds are very persistent in holding on to territories and may remain even in case of conflict with other individuals, if enough food sources are available. They are generally solitary outside of the breeding season and will tend to follow individual ant swarms through the forest.
Like other antbirds, they perform anting, which is the process of brushing small insects through their wing and tail feathers. It is still unknown whether the main function of this process is to ease irritation during moulting, kill mites, or detoxify distasteful insects.

Diet
The white-plumed antbird is an insectivore that eats insects, arthropods and at times lizards. Like all obligate antbirds, they rely on army ants to flush out these prey from the leaf litter.

Alarm behavior
While foraging, white-plumed antbirds may remain immobile for long periods of time so that they will not be attacked by larger antbirds or predators. In case of confrontation or alarm, they may "panic, flee and chip" instead. This reaction to danger involves the bird darting back and forth making chipping noises, spreading its tail and flicking rapidly to find their last prey items before fleeing. In reaction to human presence, the bird tends to make a chirring sound and mob the intruder.

Reproduction
The courtship of white-plumed antbirds is essentially the same as in other antbirds. Courtship involves the male feeding the female, mutual grooming and the male showing the female possible nest sites, a display known as "draping". Both the female and male help build the nest. White-plumed antbirds typically build their bottom-supported cup nests atop live vegetation such as small palms, sedges and tuberous plants. Although the plant chosen is alive, it will often have a mat of dead leaves at the crown. The nest is built sunken into these dead leaves to hide it from predators. The nests themselves are composed of dark-coloured fibrous rootlets (inner lining) and dead leaves (outer layers). Typically two eggs are laid per clutch. The eggs have a rosy-white base colour with many longitudinal rosy-brown flecks and a few rosy hairline markings covering the surface. After hatching, each fledgling is fed for about a month. In certain locations, such as Manaus, they breed for much of the year and females are known to leave their mate (caring for their offspring) in order to start a new nest with a new mate as quickly as possible.

Vocalization
This species has 11 different calls (described in detail by Willis (1981)), 8 of which are similar to another species (the Bicolored Antbird) and 3 that are fairly unusual. They have a loud, structurally complex and unique, whistling song. This song is used between mates and young separated by vegetation and individuals searching for ants. An adult may also sing three or more short soft tweeting notes ("see-see-see") when searching for a young or a mate, followed by "beie, beie, beie" if they do not appear quickly. Their other calls are typically quieter and shorter than those of other species of antbird. Several of their calls are used for agonistic behaviour and as predation warnings. There are two main calls with the latter function, one that is very high and thin because it is hard to locate the source of such sounds, and a kind of buzzing (aimed mostly at ground predators and humans) that mimics the lower warning growls of carnivores.

Moult
The white-plumed antbird uses a complex basic moult strategy, meaning that the juvenile performs a preliminary moult before it moults into its characteristic adult feathers. This first moult occurs soon after they begin to feed themselves. As adults, they perform at most one moult a year and plumage remains unchanging. A complete wing moult is quite variable, slow and irregular, especially in breeding birds. The moult takes approximately 301 days to complete, thus there can only be a single annual moult. Moults may not occur annually and can start at any time of year.

References

External links

Stamps (for Guyana) with RangeMap
White-plumed antbird photo gallery VIREO Photo-High Res

white-plumed antbird
Birds of Colombia
Birds of Venezuela
Birds of the Guianas
Birds of the Ecuadorian Amazon
Birds of the Peruvian Amazon
white-plumed antbird
white-plumed antbird
Taxonomy articles created by Polbot